Li Sigrid Andersson (born 13 May 1987) is a Finnish politician who has been serving as Minister of Education since 2019. The leader of the Left Alliance, she has been a Member of Parliament since 2015. She is also the city councilor of Turku and was the chair of the party's youth wing, Left Youth.

Education
Andersson graduated from Åbo Akademi University in 2010 with a Bachelor of Social Sciences degree in international law, specializing in international human rights law and refugee law, with a minor in Russian language and culture.

Political career 
In the parliamentary elections of 2015 Andersson was elected with the highest number of personal votes in Varsinais-Suomi (with 17 seats). Candidates in the district included the chairmen of the National Coalition Party and the Green League. In the 2017 municipal elections, she got most votes of candidates outside Helsinki, sixth nationally.

In February 2016, Andersson announced running for Left Alliance chair. On 6 June 2016, she received 3,913 (61.85%) votes in an unofficial poll between the party members, after which the other candidates withdrew from the running, leaving her the only remaining candidate. The decision was confirmed on 11 June 2016 at the Left Alliance party meeting in Oulu.

After the 2019 parliamentary election, in which the Left Alliance gained four seats, the party joined the SDP-led Rinne Cabinet. Andersson became Minister of Education. She temporarily left her ministerial post in December 2020 to go on maternity leave.

Andersson belongs to the Swedish-speaking Finn national minority.

Personal life 
Li Andersson cohabits with former ice-hockey player  in Turku. She gave birth to their first child, a daughter, in January 2021.

Honors 

  Order of the White Rose of Finland (Finland, 2022)

Electoral history

Municipal elections

Parliamentary elections

European Parliament elections 

Source:

References

Further reading
 Opening speech at the Future of the Arctic climate-seminar. Blog post on Li Andersson's website. Published 9 September 2017.
 Where Next for Finland’s Welfare State?. Interview with Li Andersson by Jacobin. Published 21 December 2017.
 Andersson calls for a new, more comprehensive basic income trial. Helsinki Times. Published 19 March 2019.

External links

 Official website

1987 births
Living people
Politicians from Turku
Swedish-speaking Finns
Left Alliance (Finland) politicians
Ministers of Education of Finland
Members of the Parliament of Finland (2015–19)
Members of the Parliament of Finland (2019–23)
21st-century Finnish women politicians
Finnish socialist feminists
Women government ministers of Finland